Cindy Dandois (born 26 October 1984) is a Belgian female mixed martial artist. She formerly competed in the Bantamweight and Featherweight divisions in Invicta and the Ultimate Fighting Championship and also the Lightweight  division in the Professional Fighters League (PFL). She began her judo training at the age of 5 under the training of Johan Laats, and freestyle wrestling at age 8 under Joseph Mewis. Dandois later transitioned into mixed martial arts and trains at Xtreme Couture Mixed Martial Arts while she is in the United States.

Personal life
Dandois is a high school teacher. She has six children: Naomi, Eleftherios, Lola Katerina, Nafisatu, Denahi and Sara-Mae.

During her time in Strikeforce she was scheduled to fight Miesha Tate, but the bout never materialized. This brought the two together, and they have been friends ever since. Tate later invited Dandois to the United States, to assist in her in training for her second fight against Ronda Rousey.

Mixed martial arts career

Early career
In January 2009, Cindy Dandois made her professional MMA debut, defeating Marloes Coenen. Over the next several years Dandois defeated champion kickboxer Jorina Baars, and took on other fighters under the M-1 banner. Dandois was going to fight Gina Carano after the latter had lost to Cris Cyborg, but had to withdraw due to getting pregnant.

Invicta FC
After three years of inactivity due to pregnancy Dandois became active again, and signed with Invicta Fighting Championships.

In her promotional debut with Invicta FC in December 2014, Dandois faced Tonya Evinger at Invicta FC 10: Waterson vs. Tiburcio. She lost the fight by armbar submission.

Dandois' next opponent was Megan Anderson, who she defeated by triangle choke submission at Invicta FC 14: Evinger vs. Kianzad.

Dandois then submitted Jessamyn Duke via armbar submission at Invicta FC 18: Grasso vs. Esquibel.

Dandois was later scheduled to face Cris Cyborg at a 140-pound catchweight, but the fight was cancelled. Daria Ibragimova was given the headliner fight instead, as a 145 title shot against Cyborg.

Ultimate Fighting Championship
In February 2017, it was announced that Dandois had signed with the UFC. In her debut, Dandois fought Alexis Davis at UFC Fight Night 108. She lost the fight via unanimous decision. Dandois later announced on her Instagram that she had been released from the UFC.

Rizin Fighting Federation
Dandois then signed with the Japanese promotion Rizin Fighting Federation. She made her debut against Reina Miura at Rizin World Grand Prix 2017: 2nd Round on December 29, 2017. She won the fight by split decision.

Bellator MMA
Dandois faced Olga Rubin on November 15, 2018 at Bellator 209
 She lost the fight via unanimous decision.

Professional Fighters League 
In March 2020, Dandois signed with Professional Fighters League. Dandois mader her debut against Kaitlin Young at PFL 3 on May 6, 2021. She lost the bout via unanimous decision.

Dandois faced Kayla Harrison on June 25, 2021 at PFL 6. She lost the bout in the first round via an arm bar submission.

Controversies

Battery incident by Mustapha Brika  
In November 2019, Dandois accused her then boyfriend Mustapha Brika, who is also a MMA fighter, of assaulting her and breaking her nose. Brika denied the assault and stated the injury was caused by Dandois herself. In December 2020 a Belgian court sentenced Brika to 50 hours of community service.

Mixed martial arts record

|-
|Loss
|align=center|16–7
|Kayla Harrison
|Submission (armbar)
|PFL 6
|
|align=center|1
|align=center|4:44
|Atlantic City, New Jersey, United States
|
|-
|Loss
|align=center|16–6
|Kaitlin Young
|Decision (unanimous)
|PFL 3 
|
|align=center| 3
|align=center| 5:00
|Atlantic City, New Jersey, United States
|
|-
| Win
| align=center| 16–5
| Eleni Mytilinaki
| Submission (armlock)
| Cage Survivor 14
| 
| align=center| 2
| align=center| 1:50
| Athens, Greece
|
|-
| Win
| align=center| 15–5
| Bethany Christensen
| Submission (triangle choke)
| Conquest of the Cage
| 
| align=center| 1
| align=center| 1:56
| Spokane, Washington, United States
|
|-
| Win
| align=center| 14–5
| Elsira Sheree Amstelveen
| Submission (triangle choke)
| Enfusion MMA 90
| 
| align=center| 1
| align=center| N/A
| Antwerp, Belgium
|
|-
| Win
| align=center| 13–5
| Gemma Pike
| Submission (Rear-Naked Choke)
| Staredown Fighting Championship 14
| 
| align=center| 1
| align=center| 2:00
| Antwerp, Belgium
|
|-
| Loss
| align=center| 12–5
| Iony Razafiarison
| Decision (split)
| European Beatdown 5
| 
| align=center| 3
| align=center| 5:00
| La Louvière, Belgium
|
|-
| Loss
| align=center| 12–4
| Olga Rubin
| Decision (unanimous)
| Bellator 209
| 
| align=center| 3
| align=center| 5:00
| Tel Aviv, Israel
|
|-
| Win
| align=center| 12–3
| Irén Rácz 
| TKO (punches)
| Staredown Fighting Championship 12
| 
| align=center| 2
| align=center| N/A
| Deurne, Belgium
| 
|-
| Win
| align=center| 11–3
| Hatice Ozyurt
| Submission (triangle choke)
| Battle Under the Tower 2018
| 
| align=center| 2
| align=center| 1:46
| Steenwijk, Netherlands
| 
|-
| Win
| align=center| 10–3
| Reina Miura
| Decision (split)
| Rizin World Grand Prix 2017: 2nd Round
| 
| align=center| 3
| align=center| 5:00
| Saitama, Japan
| 
|-
| Win
| align=center| 9–3
| Kerry Hughes
| TKO (punches)
| Cage Warriors 89
| 
| align=center| 1
| align=center| 1:53
| Lotto Arena, Antwerp, Belgium
|
|-
|Loss
|align=center|8–3
|Alexis Davis
|Decision (unanimous)
|UFC Fight Night: Swanson vs. Lobov
|
|align=center|3
|align=center|5:00
|Nashville, Tennessee, United States
|
|-
| Win
| align=center| 8–2
| Anjela Pink
| Submission (armbar)
| COTC - Conquest of the Cage 24
| 
| align=center| 1
| align=center| 0:13
| Airway Heights, Washington, United States
| 
|-
| Win
| align=center| 7–2
| Jessamyn Duke
| Submission (armbar)
| Invicta FC 18: Grasso vs. Esquibel
| 
| align=center| 1
| align=center| 1:33
| Kansas City, Missouri, United States
| 
|-
| Win
| align=center| 6–2
| Megan Anderson
| Submission (triangle choke)
| Invicta FC 14: Evinger vs. Kianzad
| 
| align=center| 2
| align=center| 2:41
| Kansas City, Missouri, United States
| 
|-
| Loss
| align=center| 5–2
| Tonya Evinger
| Submission (armbar)
| Invicta FC 10: Waterson vs. Tiburcio
| 
| align=center| 2
| align=center| 1:23
| Houston, Texas, United States
| 
|-
| Win
| align=center| 5–1
| Jorina Baars
| TKO (punches)
| Staredown
| 
| align=center| 2
| align=center| 4:50
| Antwerp, Belgium
| 
|-
| Loss
| align=center| 4–1
| Yana Kunitskaya
| TKO (punches)
| M-1 Challenge 22
| 
| align=center| 1
| align=center| 0:34
| Moscow, Russia
| 
|-
| Win
| align=center| 4–0
| Sheila Gaff
| DQ (illegal knee)
| M-1 Selection 2010: Western Europe Round 3
| 
| align=center| 3
| align=center| 0:10
| Helsinki, Finland
| 
|-
| Win
| align=center| 3–0
| Daria Ibragimova
| Submission (triangle choke)
| M-1 Selection 2010: Western Europe Round 2
| 
| align=center| 1
| align=center| 3:02
| Weesp, Netherlands
| 
|-
| Win
| align=center| 2–0
| Maria Hougaard Djursaa
| TKO (punches)
| M-1 Selection 2010: Western Europe Round 1
| 
| align=center| 1
| align=center| 1:12
| Hilversum, Netherlands
| 
|-
| Win
| align=center| 1–0
| Marloes Coenen
| Decision (unanimous)
| Beast of the East
| 
| align=center| 3
| align=center| 5:00
| Zutphen, Netherlands
| 
|-
|}

See also
 List of male mixed martial artists

References

External links

 
 Cindy Dandois at PFL
 

1984 births
Sportspeople from Antwerp
Featherweight mixed martial artists
Living people
Bantamweight mixed martial artists
Mixed martial artists utilizing judo
Catgeory:Mixed martial artists utilizing wrestling
Mixed martial artists utilizing Brazilian jiu-jitsu
Belgian female judoka
Belgian female mixed martial artists
Belgian Christians
Belgian practitioners of Brazilian jiu-jitsu
Female Brazilian jiu-jitsu practitioners
Belgian schoolteachers
21st-century Belgian educators
Lightweight mixed martial artists
Ultimate Fighting Championship female fighters